Kapiri Mposhi is a Zambian town, seat of the Kapiri Mposhi District, Central Province. Located north of Lusaka, it stands on the Great North Road and is significant for the railway connection between Zambia Railways line from Kitwe to Lusaka and Livingstone and western terminal (New Kapiri Mposhi) of the Tanzania-Zambia Railway Authority from Dar es Salaam since 1976.

Geography

The town lies in the middle of Zambia, next to the borders with Copperbelt Province.

The town is approximately 60 km north of Kabwe and 110 km south of Ndola. It is situated at the junction of the T2 road (Great North Road; which connects south to Kabwe and Lusaka and north-east to Mpika and Tanzania) and the T3 road (which connects north to Ndola, Kitwe, Chingola and the Democratic Republic Of Congo).

Kapiri Mposhi District covers an area measuring approximately 18,250 square kilometres.

It is surrounded by 8 Districts, namely, Kabwe District to the south, Chisamba District to the south-east, Luano District on the east, Mkushi District on the north-east, Masaiti District to the north, Mpongwe District to the north-west, Ngabwe District to the west and Chibombo District to the south-west.

Transport
Kapiri Mposhi has two railways stations, a TAZARA Railway station that connects it to Dar-es-Salaam in the north-east and a Zambia Railways station that connects it to Lusaka and Livingstone in the south and to Ndola and Kitwe in the north. The TAZARA Railway station is considerably larger and more modern than the Zambia Railways station. 

Just north of the town, there is a major road junction, that is the junction of the T3 road (which goes north to Ndola, Kitwe, Chingola and the Democratic Republic of Congo) and the T2 road (Zambia's Great North Road; which goes north-east to Serenje, Mpika, and the Republic of Tanzania and south through Kapiri Mposhi to Kabwe and Lusaka). This, combined with the railway links, makes Kapiri Mposhi an important point in the regional freight network.

Economy
Most shops and businesses in Kapiri Mposhi can be found along the main road and include a bakery, Agricultural Equipment shop CAMCO EQUIPMENT (Z) LTD,Auto World,Bata, Pep, Shoprite,Chops,Steers, LK Motors and Barclays bank. The Urban Health Center is along the Great North Road just Behind Choppies Supermarket.

Famous residents

Janny Sikazwe, association football referee.

Gallery

See also

 Kapiri Mposhi (Zambian constituency)
 Railway stations in Zambia
 Railway stations in Tanzania

References

External links

 A portrait of the town

Populated places in Central Province, Zambia